Anna Maria von Baden-Durlach (May 29, 1617 – October 17, 1672) was a German poet and painter. She was a daughter of Margrave Georg Friedrich von Baden.

Life
Anna Maria von Baden-Durlach was a daughter of Margrave Georg Friedrich von Baden from his second marriage to Agathe of Erbach. After the early death of her mother (1621) she grew up under the care of her "faithful Starschedelin" in the Margrave's Dragon Castle on the Ill in Strasbourg. Like her younger sister Elisabeth, she received a thorough education, although at the time the Thirty Years War was worsening. She had a poetic and artistic talent, and quite early she began to write and paint.

According to Karl Obser (1935), her poetry was influenced by the Strasbourg "Sincere Society of the Firs". She wrote poems and sayings. "They are free of baroque tears and express their instructive wisdom and their simple-religious meaning in a pleasing way. The poetic element is small, but the God-given view of life finds and gives consolation". "Some examples of headings may illustrate their moral purpose and life experience: Anger is an evil of all evils . A faithful friend is a great treasure , praise of humility , thought from eternity ,Beauty passes, virtue persists."

Anna Maria of Baden-Durlach also wrote a longer poem about the Swedish king Gustavus Adolphus (1647), a lovely bukolika on "the Lord's President Selmmitzen Feldgut zu Berghausen". She also translated poems from Italian and French, occasional poems wrote to name days.  Her literary work was not published during her lifetime.

Among her works there are red chalk, Indian ink and pen drawings, portraits and tracings on the Dutch model, animal and flower displays. Her work was usually given to family members or friends.

Anna Maria von Baden-Durlach was closely associated with her younger sister Elisabeth, who was also artistically active, but less gifted. They worked together on many things. Anna Maria maintained contacts to numerous artists. In the field of paper cutting she made remarkable. After she had spent the youth in Strasbourg, later lived alternately in the Margravial courts in Basel and Strasbourg. She remained unmarried. Although she died in Basel, she was buried in Pforzheim on November 1, 1672.

References

Citations

Bibliography
 Karl Obser: "Oberrheinische Miniaturbildnisse. Friedrich Brentels und seiner Schule." In: Zeitschrift für die Geschichte des Oberrheins, Karlsruhe: Braun 1935, S. 1–25
 Hans Rott: Kunst und Künstler am Baden-Durlacher Hofe bis zur Gründung Karlsruhes, Karlsruhe: Müller 1917
 Wilhelm Engelbert Oestering: "Geschichte der Literatur in Baden. Ein Abriß, I. Teil, Vom Kloster bis zur Klassik." In „Heimatblätter Vom Bodensee zum Main“, 36, Karlsruhe: Müller 1930, S. 3–102
 Karl Zell: Fürstentöchter des Hauses Baden. Eine geschichtliche Darstellung zur Feier der Vermählung … der Prinzessin Alexandrine von Baden mit … dem Erbprinzen Ernst von Sachsen-Koburg-Gotha, Karlsruhe: Braun 1842
 
 Johann Christian Keck: Angst und Trost der Christen, Bey der Durchlauchtigsten Fürstin, Prinzessin Annae, Marggräffin… zu Baden und Hochberg, … zu Pforzheim den 1. November 1672 vollbrachter Bestattung. Durlach 1672 Digitalisat bei der Badischen Landesbibliothek

17th-century German painters
German women painters
17th-century German poets
German women poets
German nobility
1617 births
1672 deaths
Artists from Strasbourg
Writers from Strasbourg
Daughters of monarchs